The following outline is provided as an overview of and topical guide to Earth science:

Earth science – all-embracing term for the sciences related to the planet Earth. It is also known as geoscience, the geosciences or the Earthquake sciences, and is arguably a special case in planetary science, the Earth being the only known life-bearing planet.

Earth science is a branch of the physical sciences which is a part of the natural sciences. It in turn has many branches.

Earth's spheres 

Ecosphere – there are many subsystems that make up the natural environment (the planetary ecosystem or "ecosphere") of the Earth. Many of the subsystems are characterized as "spheres", coinciding with the shape of the planet. The four spheres (for which most of the other spheres are a subtype of) are the atmosphere, the biosphere, the hydrosphere and the geosphere. Listed roughly from outermost to innermost the named spheres of the Earth are:

 Magnetosphere – The region around an astronomical object in which charged particles are affected by its magnetic field
 Atmosphere,  the gases that surround the Earth (its air)
By altitude
 Exosphere – The outermost layer of an atmosphere
 Exobase – The lower boundary of the exosphere
 Thermopause – The upper boundary of the thermosphere
 Thermosphere – The layer of the atmosphere above the mesosphere and below the exosphere
 Mesopause – The temperature minimum at the boundary between the mesosphere and the thermosphere
 Mesosphere – The layer of the atmosphere directly above the stratosphere and below the thermosphere
 Stratopause – The upper boundary of the stratosphere
 Stratosphere – The layer of the atmosphere above the troposphere
 Ozone layer – The region of Earth's stratosphere that absorbs most of the Sun's UV radiation
 Tropopause – The boundary of the atmosphere between the troposphere and stratosphere
 Troposphere – The lowest layer of the atmosphere
 Planetary boundary layer – The lowest part of the atmosphere, directly influenced by contact with the planetary surface
By air turbulence
 Heterosphere – Upper parts of the atmosphere in which the component gases are not well mixed
 Turbopause – The altitude in the Earth's atmosphere below which turbulent mixing dominates
 Homosphere – Lower parts of the atmosphere in which the component gases are well mixed
Other
 Ionosphere – The ionized part of Earth's upper atmosphere
 Biosphere – The global sum of all ecosystems on Earth
 Anthroposphere – The part of the environment that is made or modified by humans for use in human activities and human habitat
 Noosphere (rare) – The sphere of human thought
 Hydrosphere – The combined mass of water found on, under, and above the surface of a planet, minor planet or natural satellite
 Cryosphere – Those portions of Earth's surface where water is in solid form
 Geosphere/Solid Earth – (Also sometimes a collective name for the lithosphere, the hydrosphere, the cryosphere, and the atmosphere) The union of all solid parts of Earth and the Inner of Earth.
 Pedosphere – The outermost layer of the Earth that is composed of soil and subject to soil formation processes
Outer layers
By composition
 Crust (geology) – The outermost solid shell of a rocky planet, dwarf planet, or natural satellite.
Moho Discontinuity– The line between the crust and the Earth's mantle.
 Earth's mantle – The part of the interior of the planet Earth between the crust and the core.
By diffusion of seismic waves
 Lithosphere – The rigid, outermost shell of a terrestrial-type planet or natural satellite that is defined by its rigid mechanical properties.
 Asthenosphere – The highly viscous, mechanically weak and ductile region of the Earth's upper mantle
 Mesozone – The part of the Earth's mantle below the lithosphere and the asthenosphere, but above the outer core.
Gutenberg discontinuity– The line between the mantle and the Earth's core.
 Earth's core – The inner part of the planet, formed by differential buoyancy of the component materials causing the denser materials to accumulate nearer to the centre.
Outer core – A fluid layer composed of mostly iron and nickel between Earth's solid inner core and its mantle.
Lehmann Discontinuity – The line between the inner core and the outer core.
Inner core – The innermost part of the Earth, a solid ball of iron-nickel alloy.

Branches of Earth science

Atmospheric science 
Atmospheric sciences – The study of the atmosphere, its processes, and interactions with other systems
 Climatology – The scientific study of climate, defined as weather conditions averaged over a period of time
 Paleoclimatology – The study of changes in climate taken on the scale of the entire history of Earth
 Atmospheric chemistry – The branch of atmospheric science in which the chemistry of the atmosphere is studied
 Atmospheric physics – The application of physics to the study of the atmosphere
 Paleotempestology – The study of past tropical cyclone activity using geological proxies and historical documents

Geology  
 Geology – The study of the composition, structure, physical properties, and history of Earth's components, and the processes by which they are shaped.
 Economic geology – Science concerned with earth materials of economic value
 Engineering geology – The application of the geology to engineering practice.
 Environmental geology – Science of the practical application of geology in environmental problems.
 Quaternary geology – The branch of geology that studies developments more recent than 2.6 million years ago
 Planetary geology – The geology of astronomical objects apparently in orbit around stellar objects
 Petroleum geology – The study of the origin, occurrence, movement, accumulation, and exploration of hydrocarbon fuels
 Historical geology – The study of the geological history of Earth
 Hydrogeology – The study of the distribution and movement of groundwater
 Structural geology – The science of the description and interpretation of deformation in the earth's crust independent of extent
 Geochemistry – Science that applies chemistry to analyse geological systems
 Geochronology – Science of determining the age of rocks, sediments and fossils
 Geodesy – The science of the geometric shape, orientation in space, and gravitational field of the Earth
 Geomagnetics – Study of the Earth's magnetic field
 Geomicrobiology – Science of the interactions between microbiology and geology
 Glaciology – Scientific study of ice and natural phenomena involving ice
 Geophysics – The physics of the Earth and its environment in space, and the study of the Earth using quantitative physical methods
 Micropaleontology – The branch of paleontology that studies microfossils
 Mineralogy – Scientific study of minerals and mineralised artifacts
 Gemology – Science dealing with natural and artificial gemstone materials
 Mineral physics – The science of materials that compose the interior of planets
 Paleontology – Scientific study of prehistoric life
 Palynology – The study of dust
 Petrology – The branch of geology that studies the origin, composition, distribution and structure of rocks
 Physical geodesy – The study of the physical properties of the Earth's gravity field
 Sedimentology – The study of natural sediments and of the processes by which they are formed
 Seismology – The scientific study of earthquakes and propagation of elastic waves through a planet
 Paleoseismology – The study of earthquakes that happened in the past
 Stratigraphy – The study of rock layers and their formation
 Volcanology – The study of volcanoes, lava, magma and associated phenomena

Geography 
Geography – The science that studies the terrestrial surface, the societies that inhabit it and the territories, landscapes, places or regions that form it.
 Physical geography – The branch of natural science which deals with the study of processes and patterns in the natural environment such as the atmosphere, hydrosphere, biosphere, and geosphere, as opposed to the cultural or built environment, the domain of human geography
 Human geography – The study of cultures, communities and activities of peoples of the world
 Cartography
 Topography
 Geostatistics – A branch of statistics focusing on spatial data sets
Environmental chemistry – The scientific study of the chemical and biochemical phenomena that occur in natural places
Environmental soil science – The study of the interaction of humans with the pedosphere as well as critical aspects of the biosphere, the lithosphere, the hydrosphere, and the atmosphere.
 Geographic information science – Scientific study of geographic data and information
 Edaphology – The science concerned with the influence of soils on living things. 
 Pedology – The study of soils in their natural environment
 Geomorphology – The scientific study of landforms and the processes that shape them
 Spatial decision support systems – Computerised aid to land use decisions
 Global Navigation Satellite Systems (GNSS) – Various satellite navigation systems
 Hydrology – The science of applying engineering techniques to the properties of the earth's water, especially its movement in relation to land.
 Meteorology – Interdisciplinary scientific study of the atmosphere focusing on weather forecasting.
 Satellite navigation – Any system that uses satellite radio signals to provide. autonomous geo-spatial positioning
 Remote sensing – Acquisition of information at a significant distance from the subject. 
 Photogrammetry – The science of making measurements using photography.

Oceanography 
Oceanography – The study of the physical and biological aspects of the ocean
 Biological oceanography – The study of how organisms affect and are affected by the physics, chemistry, and geology of the oceanographic system.
 Physical oceanography – The study of physical conditions and physical processes within the ocean
 Chemical oceanography – The study of ocean chemistry
 Paleoceanography – The study of the history of the oceans in the geologic past
 Limnology – The science of inland aquatic ecosystems
 Marine geology – The study of the history and structure of the ocean floor

Planetary science 
Planetary science – The study of planets (including Earth), moons, and planetary systems (in particular those of the Solar System) and the processes that form them.
 Planetary geology - study of the geology of astronomical objects apparently in orbit around stellar objects
 Selenography - study of the surface and physical features of the Moon
 Theoretical planetology - the theoretical study of the internal structure of planets by making assumptions about their chemical composition and the state of their materials, then calculating the radial distribution of various properties such as temperature, pressure, or density of material across the planet's internals.

History of Earth science 

History of Earth science – history of the all-embracing  sciences related to the planet Earth. Earth science, and all of its branches, are branches of physical science.
 History of atmospheric sciences – history of the  umbrella study of the atmosphere, its processes, the effects other systems have on the atmosphere, and the effects of the atmosphere on these other systems.
 History of atmospheric chemistry
 History of biogeography – history of the study of the distribution of species (biology), organisms, and ecosystems in geographic space and through geological time.
 History of cartography – history of the study and practice of making maps or globes.
 History of climatology – history of the study of climate, scientifically defined as weather conditions averaged over a period of time
 History of coastal geography – history of the study of the dynamic interface between the ocean and the land, incorporating both the physical geography (i.e. coastal geomorphology, geology and oceanography) and the human geography (sociology and history) of the coast.
 History of environmental science – history of an integrated, quantitative, and interdisciplinary approach to the study of environmental systems.
History of ecology – history of the scientific study of the distribution and abundance of living organisms and how the distribution and abundance are affected by interactions between the organisms and their environment.
 History of Freshwater biology – history of the scientific biological study of freshwater ecosystems and is a branch of limnology
 History of marine biology – history of the scientific study of organisms in the ocean or other marine or brackish bodies of water
 History of parasitology – history of the Parasitology is the study of parasites, their hosts, and the relationship between them.
 History of population dynamics – history of the Population dynamics is the branch of life sciences that studies short-term and long-term changes in the size and age composition of populations, and the biological and environmental processes influencing those changes.
History of environmental chemistry – history of the Environmental chemistry is the scientific study of the chemical and biochemical phenomena that occur in natural places.
History of environmental soil science – history of the Environmental soil science is the study of the interaction of humans with the pedosphere as well as critical aspects of the biosphere, the lithosphere, the hydrosphere, and the atmosphere.
History of environmental geology – history of the Environmental geology, like hydrogeology, is an applied science concerned with the practical application of the principles of geology in the solving of environmental problems.
History of toxicology – history of the branch of biology, chemistry, and medicine concerned with the study of the adverse effects of chemicals on living organisms.
 History of geodesy – history of the scientific discipline that deals with the measurement and representation of the Earth, including its gravitational field, in a three-dimensional time-varying space
 History of geography – history of the science that studies the lands, features, inhabitants, and phenomena of Earth
 History of geoinformatics – history of the science and the technology which develops and uses information science infrastructure to address the problems of geography, geosciences and related branches of engineering.
 History of geology – history of the study of the Earth, with the general exclusion of present-day life, flow within the ocean, and the atmosphere.
 History of planetary geology – history of the planetary science discipline concerned with the geology of the celestial bodies such as the planets and their moons, asteroids, comets, and meteorites.
 History of geomorphology – history of the scientific study of landforms and the processes that shape them
 History of geostatistics – history of the branch of statistics focusing on spatial or spatiotemporal datasets
 History of geophysics – history of the physics of the Earth and its environment in space; also the study of the Earth using quantitative physical methods.
 History of glaciology – history of the study of glaciers, or more generally ice and natural phenomena that involve ice.
 History of hydrology – history of the study of the movement, distribution, and quality of water on Earth and other planets, including the hydrologic cycle, water resources and environmental watershed sustainability.
 History of hydrogeology – history of the area of geology that deals with the distribution and movement of groundwater in the soil and rocks of the Earth's crust (commonly in aquifers).
 History of mineralogy – history of the study of chemistry, crystal structure, and physical (including optical) properties of minerals.
 History of meteorology – history of the interdisciplinary scientific study of the atmosphere which explains and forecasts weather events.
 History of oceanography – history of the branch of Earth science that studies the ocean
 History of paleoclimatology – history of the study of changes in climate taken on the scale of the entire history of Earth
 History of paleontology – history of the study of prehistoric life
 History of petrology – history of the branch of geology that studies the origin, composition, distribution and structure of rocks.
 History of limnology – history of the study of inland waters
 History of seismology – history of the scientific study of earthquakes and the propagation of elastic waves through the Earth or through other planet-like bodies
 History of soil science – history of the study of soil as a natural resource on the surface of the Earth including soil formation, classification and mapping; physical, chemical, biological, and fertility properties of soils; and these properties in relation to the use and management of soils.
 History of topography – history of the study of surface shape and features of the Earth and other observable astronomical objects including planets, moons, and asteroids.
 History of volcanology – history of the study of volcanoes, lava, magma, and related geological, geophysical and geochemical phenomena.

Earth science programs 

 NASA Earth Science

Earth science organizations 
List of geoscience organizations

Earth science journals

People influential in Earth science

See also 

 Outline of science – 
 Outline of natural science – 
 Outline of physical science – 
 Outline of Earth science
 Outline of formal science – 
 Outline of social science – 
 Outline of applied science –

References

External links 

Earth Science Picture of the Day, a service of Universities Space Research Association, sponsored by NASA Goddard Space Flight Center
Geoethics in Planetary and Space Exploration
National Earth Science Teachers Association

 
Earth science
Earth science
Earth science